In mathematics, in particular in category theory, the lifting property is a property of a pair of morphisms in a category. It is used in homotopy theory within algebraic topology to define properties of morphisms starting from an explicitly given class of morphisms. It appears in a prominent way in the theory of model categories, an axiomatic framework for homotopy theory introduced by Daniel Quillen. It is also used in the definition of a factorization system, and of a weak factorization system, notions related to but less restrictive than the notion of a model category. Several elementary notions may also be expressed using the lifting property starting from a list of (counter)examples.

Formal definition

This is sometimes also known as the morphism  being orthogonal to the morphism ; however, this can also refer to

In notation,

Thus, in the category Set of sets, the right orthogonal  of the simplest non-surjection  is the class of surjections. The left and right orthogonals of  the simplest non-injection, are both precisely the class of injections, 

The class  is always closed under retracts, pullbacks, (small) products (whenever they exist in the category) & composition of morphisms, and contains all isomorphisms (that is, invertible morphisms) of the underlying category. Meanwhile,  is closed under retracts, pushouts, (small) coproducts & transfinite composition (filtered colimits) of morphisms (whenever they exist in the category), and also contains all isomorphisms.

Examples
A useful intuition is to think that the property of left-lifting against a class  is a kind of negation

Examples of lifting properties in algebraic topology
A map  has the path lifting property iff  where  is the inclusion of one end point of the closed interval into the interval .

A map  has the homotopy lifting property iff  where  is the map .

Examples of lifting properties coming from model categories
Fibrations and cofibrations.

 Let Top be the category of topological spaces, and let  be the class of maps , embeddings of the boundary  of a ball into the ball . Let  be the class of maps embedding the upper semi-sphere into the disk.  are the classes of fibrations, acyclic cofibrations, acyclic fibrations, and cofibrations.

 Let sSet be the category of simplicial sets. Let  be the class of boundary inclusions , and let  be the class of horn inclusions . Then the classes of fibrations, acyclic cofibrations, acyclic fibrations, and cofibrations are, respectively, .

 Let  be the category of chain complexes over a commutative ring . Let  be the class of maps of form
 
 and  be
 
Then  are the classes of fibrations, acyclic cofibrations, acyclic fibrations, and cofibrations.

Elementary examples in various categories
In Set, 

  is the class of surjections,

  is the class of injections.

In the category  of modules over a commutative ring ,

  is the class of surjections, resp. injections,

In the category  of groups, 

 , resp. , is the class of injections, resp. surjections (where  denotes the infinite cyclic group),

 A group  is a free group iff  is in 

 A group  is torsion-free iff  is in 

For a finite group , 

  iff  is a -group,

  is nilpotent iff the diagonal map  is in  where  denotes the class of maps 

 a finite group  is soluble iff  is in 

In the category  of topological spaces, let , resp.  denote the discrete, resp. antidiscrete space with two points 0 and 1. Let  denote the Sierpinski space of two points where the point 0 is open and the point 1 is closed, and let  etc. denote the obvious embeddings.

 a space  satisfies the separation axiom T0 iff  is in 

 a space  satisfies the separation axiom T1 iff  is in 

  is the class of maps with dense image, 

  is the class of surjective maps, 

  is the class of maps of form  where  is discrete,

  is the class of maps  such that each connected component of  intersects ,

  is the class of injective maps,

 a space  is perfectly normal iff  where the open interval  goes to , and  maps to the point , and  maps to the point , and  denotes the three-point space with two closed points  and one open point .

In the category of metric spaces with uniformly continuous maps.

 A subspace  is closed iff

Notes

References
 

Category theory